Curling was a demonstration sport at the 1992 Winter Olympics.  The competition was held in the patinoire olympique of Pralognan-la-Vanoise, a venue about 50 km from the host city, Albertville. The 1992 Winter Games was the third time curling was a demonstration sport at the Winter Olympics.

Medal summary

Medal table

Events

Men
The men's competition had eight countries in two groups.

Teams

Round robin

Pool A

Standings

Results

Pool B

Standings

Results

Ranking games

5th/6th place

7th/8th place

Playoffs

Semi-finals

Bronze medal game

Gold medal game

Women
The women's curling event at the 1992 Winter Olympics had eight countries in two groups.

Teams

Round robin

Pool A

Standings

Results

Tie-breakers

Pool B

Standings

Results

Ranking games

5th/6th place

7th/8th place

Playoffs

Semifinals

Bronze medal game

Gold medal game

References

External links
Official report

 
1992 Winter Olympics events
1992 in curling
1992
Curling competitions in France
Men's events at the 1992 Winter Olympics
Women's events at the 1992 Winter Olympics